The Lunatics of Terra is a collection of science fiction short stories by John Sladek, published in 1984.

Contents
 "The Last of the Whaleburgers"
 "Great Mysteries Explained"
 "Red Noise"
 "Guesting"
 "Absent Friends"
 "After Flaubert"
 "The Brass Monkey"
 "White Hat"
 "The Island of Dr Circe"
 "Answers"
 "Breakfast with the Murgatroyds"
 "The Next Dwarf"
 "An Explanation for the Disappearance of the Moon"
 "How To Make Major Scientific Discoveries at Home in Your Spare Time"
 "The Kindly Ones"
 "Fables"
 "Ursa Minor"
 "Calling All Gumdrops!"

Reception
Dave Langford reviewed The Lunatics of Terra for White Dwarf #57, and stated that "He's especially good on pseudoscience, getting right inside that viewpoint in the tragicomic 'An Explanation for the Disappearance of the Moon'. Topnotch stuff."

Reviews
Review by Chris Morgan (1984) in Fantasy Review, September 1984
Review by Edward James (1984) in Vector 122
Review by Andrew M. Butler (2006) in Vector 247

External links

References

1984 short story collections
American short story collections